Events from the year 1819 in the United States.

Incumbents

Federal Government 
 President: James Monroe (DR-Virginia)
 Vice President: Daniel D. Tompkins (DR-New York)
 Chief Justice: John Marshall (Virginia)
 Speaker of the House of Representatives: Henry Clay (DR-Kentucky)
 Congress: 15th (until March 4), 16th (starting March 4)

Events
January 2 – The Panic of 1819, the first major financial crisis in the United States, begins.
January 25 – Thomas Jefferson founds the University of Virginia.
January 30 – Romney Literary Society established as the Polemic Society of Romney, West Virginia.
February 2 – The Supreme Court under John Marshall rules in favor of Dartmouth College in the famous Dartmouth College v. Woodward case, allowing Dartmouth to keep its charter and remain a private institution.
February 15 – The United States House of Representatives agrees to the Tallmadge Amendment barring slaves from the new state of Missouri (the opening vote in a controversy that leads to the Missouri Compromise).
February 22 – Spain cedes Florida to the United States by the Adams–Onís Treaty signed in Washington, D.C. (effective 2 years hence).
March 1 – The U.S. naval vessel USS Columbus is launched in Washington, D.C.
March 2 – Arkansas Territory is created.
March 6 – McCulloch v. Maryland: The U.S. Supreme Court rules that the Bank of the United States is constitutional.
May 22 –  The  leaves port at Savannah, Georgia on a voyage to become the first steamship to cross the Atlantic Ocean. The ship arrives at Liverpool, England on June 20.
June 22 – In Nacogdoches, Texas, Dr James Long and his force of 195 men declares a new government, with Long as President and a 21-member Supreme Council.
June 23 – James Long issues a Declaration of Independence for his "Republic of Texas" (known as the Long Republic to avoid confusion with the later Republic of Texas); the document is based on the United States Declaration of Independence and cites grievances including "Spanish rapacity" and "Odious tyranny", promising Religious freedom, Freedom of the Press and Free trade.

July 4 – Arkansas Territory is effective.
August 6 – Norwich University is founded by Captain Alden Partridge in Vermont as the first private military school in the United States.
August 24 – Samuel Seymour sketches a Kansa lodge and war dance at the present location of Manhattan, Kansas, while part of Stephen Harriman Long's exploring party.  This work is now the oldest drawing known to be made in the state of Kansas.
October – The ʻAi Noa movement assumes power in Hawaii.
November 3 – The , commanded by Captain John D. Henley, becomes the first U.S. warship to visit China, landing at Lintin Island off of the coast of Canton.
December 14 – Alabama is admitted as the 22nd U.S. state (see History of Alabama).
 The African Slave Trade Patrol is founded to stop the slave trade on the coast of West Africa.

Ongoing
 Era of Good Feelings (1817–1825)

Births
 January 3 – Thomas H. Watts, 18th Governor of Alabama, 3rd Confederate States Attorney General (died 1892)
 January 22 – Morton S. Wilkinson, U.S. Senator from Minnesota from 1859 to 1865 (died 1894)
 February 12 – William Wetmore Story, sculptor, art critic, poet and editor (died 1895)
 February 22 – James Russell Lowell, poet (died 1891)
 February 23 – George S. Cook, prominent early photographer (died 1902)
 March 29 – Edwin Drake, first American to drill for oil successfully (died 1880)
 April 11 – Margaret Lea Houston, First Lady of the Republic of Texas (died 1867)
 June 29 – Thomas Dunn English, politician and poet (died 1902)
 June 30 – William A. Wheeler, 19th Vice President of the United States from 1877 to 1881 (died 1887)
 July 17 – Eunice Newton Foote, physicist and women's rights campaigner (died 1888)
 July 24 – Josiah Gilbert Holland, novelist and poet (died 1881)
 July 26 – Justin Holland, classical guitarist and civil rights activist (died 1887)
 May 27 – Julia Ward Howe, poet and abolitionist (died 1910)
 May 28 – William Birney, Union Army general, abolitionist, attorney and writer (died 1907)
 May 31 – Walt Whitman, poet, essayist and journalist (died 1892)
 August 1 – Herman Melville, novelist, short story writer and poet (died 1891)
 August 9 – William T. G. Morton, pioneer of anesthesia (died 1868)
 August 29 – Joseph E. McDonald, U.S. Senator from Indiana from 1875 to 1881 (died 1891)
 September 7 – Thomas A. Hendricks, U.S. Senator from Indiana from 1863 to 1869 and 21st Vice President of the United States from March to November 1885 (died 1885)
 September 14 – Henry Jackson Hunt, Chief of Artillery in the Army of the Potomac during the American Civil War (died 1889)
 October 2 – Théonie Rivière Mignot, restaurateur (died 1875)
 December 26 – E. D. E. N. Southworth, née Emma Nevitte, novelist (died 1899)
 Mary Jane Richardson Jones, abolitionist (died 1910)

Deaths
 February 5 – Hannah Van Buren, wife of Martin Van Buren, 8th President of the U.S. (born 1783)
 March 8 – Benjamin Ruggles Woodbridge, doctor and Massachusetts militia commander (born 1739)
 April 15 – Oliver Evans, inventor and pioneer in the fields of automation and steam power (born 1755)
 May 22 – Hugh Williamson, Founding Father (born 1735)
 July 1 – the Public Universal Friend, preacher (born 1754)
 August 23 – Oliver Hazard Perry, naval officer (born 1785)
 September 18 – John Langdon, Founding Father (born 1741)
 October 7 – William Samuel Johnson, Founding Father (born 1727)
 November 7 – Caleb Strong, lawyer and politician, 6th and 10th Governor of Massachusetts (born 1745)
 November 9 – Simon Snyder, politician (born 1759)

See also
Timeline of United States history (1790–1819)

Further reading
 Slavery in Virginia, 1819. Proceedings of the Massachusetts Historical Society, Third Series, Vol. 43, (October, 1909 – June, 1910)
 Letter of William Wirt, 1819. The American Historical Review, Vol. 25, No. 4 (July, 1920), pp. 692–695
 J. Wilfrid Parsons. The Catholic Church in America in 1819: A Contemporary Account. The Catholic Historical Review, Vol. 5, No. 4 (January, 1920), pp. 301–310
 Report of Inspection of the Ninth Military Department, 1819. The Mississippi Valley Historical Review, Vol. 7, No. 3 (December, 1920), pp. 261–274
 Samuel Rezneck. The Depression of 1819–1822, A Social History. The American Historical Review, Vol. 39, No. 1 (October, 1933), pp. 28–47
 Martin Staples Shockley. The Proprietors of Richmond's New Theatre of 1819. The William and Mary Quarterly, Second Series, Vol. 19, No. 3 (July, 1939), pp. 302–308
 Dorothy Riker. Two accounts of the upper Wabash country, 1819–20. Indiana Magazine of History, Vol. 37, No. 4 (1941), pp. 384–395
 Fritz Redlich. William Jones and His Unsuccessful Steamboat Venture of 1819. Bulletin of the Business Historical Society, Vol. 21, No. 5 (November, 1947), pp. 125–136
 Paul C. Henlein, F. Renick, W. Renick. Journal of F. and W. Renick on an Exploring Tour to the Mississippi and Missouri Rivers in the Year 1819. Agricultural History, Vol. 30, No. 4 (October, 1956), pp. 174–186
 Philip F. Detweiler. Congressional Debate on Slavery and the Declaration of Independence, 1819–1821. The American Historical Review, Vol. 63, No. 3 (April, 1958), pp. 598–616
 Helen McCann White. Frontier Feud: 1819–20: How Two Officers Quarreled All the Way to the Site of Fort Snelling. Minnesota History, Vol. 42, No. 3, Fort Snelling Issue (Fall, 1970), pp. 99–114
 Frederic Trautmann. Pennsylvania through a German's Eyes: The Travels of Ludwig Gall, 1819–1820. The Pennsylvania Magazine of History and Biography, Vol. 105, No. 1 (January, 1981), pp. 35–65
 Andrew R. L. Cayton. The Fragmentation of "A Great Family": The Panic of 1819 and the Rise of the Middling Interest in Boston, 1818–1822. Journal of the Early Republic, Vol. 2, No. 2 (Summer, 1982), pp. 143–167
 Edwin J. Perkins. Langdon Cheves and the Panic of 1819: A Reassessment. The Journal of Economic History, Vol. 44, No. 2, The Tasks of Economic History (June, 1984), pp. 455–461
 Robert M. Blackson. Pennsylvania Banks and the Panic of 1819: A Reinterpretation. Journal of the Early Republic, Vol. 9, No. 3 (Autumn, 1989), pp. 335–358
 Clyde Haulman. Virginia Commodity Prices during the Panic of 1819. Journal of the Early Republic, Vol. 22, No. 4 (Winter, 2002), pp. 675–688
 David Anthony. "Gone Distracted": "Sleepy Hollow," Gothic Masculinity, and the Panic of 1819. Early American Literature, Vol. 40, No. 1 (2005), pp. 111–144

References

External links
 

 
1810s in the United States
United States
United States
Years of the 19th century in the United States